Catherine L. Carr (born May 27, 1954), also known by her married name Cathy West, is an American former competition swimmer, Olympic champion, and former world record-holder in two events.

Carr was born in Albuquerque, New Mexico, and graduated from Highland High School in Albuquerque. She trained for the Olympics with the Coronado Swim Club under 1960 Olympic gold medalist Mike Troy.

Carr represented the United States at the 1972 Summer Olympics in Munich, Germany. Individually, she won a gold medal in the women's 100-meter breaststroke, setting a new world of 1:13.58 in the final, and besting Soviet Galina Prozumenshchikova by 1.41 seconds. She won a gold medal swimming the breaststroke leg for the first-place U.S. team in the women's 4×100-meter medley relay, together with her teammates Melissa Belote (backstroke), Deena Deardurff (butterfly), and Sandy Neilson (freestyle). The American medley relay team set a new world record of 4:20.75 in the event final, beating the East German and West German teams by 4.16 and 5.71 seconds, respectively.

She held the long course world record in the 100-meter breaststroke (set at the 1972 Olympics) from September 2, 1972, to August 22, 1974.  Her world record in the 4×100-meter medley relay survived from September 2, 1972, to September 4, 1973.  Carr was inducted into the International Swimming Hall of Fame as an "Honor Swimmer" in 1988.

Carr initially attended the University of New Mexico, before transferring to the University of California, Davis.  She swam for the first UC Davis Aggies women's swim team, and graduated in 1977. She used to work at Sierra Vista Elementary School in Vacaville, California teaching third grade, and Pioneer Elementary School in Davis, California teaching the AIM fourth grade class. She is now retired from teaching.

She was inducted into the International Swimming Hall of Fame as an "Honor Swimmer" in 1988.

See also

 List of Olympic medalists in swimming (women)
 List of University of California, Davis alumni
 World record progression 100 metres breaststroke
 World record progression 4 × 100 metres medley relay

References

External links

1954 births
Living people
American female breaststroke swimmers
World record setters in swimming
Medalists at the 1972 Summer Olympics
Olympic gold medalists for the United States in swimming
Sportspeople from Albuquerque, New Mexico
Swimmers at the 1972 Summer Olympics
Universiade medalists in swimming
University of California, Davis alumni
Universiade gold medalists for the United States
Universiade silver medalists for the United States
Medalists at the 1973 Summer Universiade
21st-century American women